Sheeley may refer to:

Sharon Sheeley, Major League Baseball pitcher
James Sheeley House, Italianate building in Chippewa Falls, Wisconsin
Sheeley Mountain, mountain in Fulton County, New York

See also
Shelley (disambiguation)